The 9th Annual Indonesian Movie Awards was an awards ceremony held on May 18, 2015, at the Balai Sarbini, South Jakarta. The show was hosted by Nirina Zubir, Ringgo Agus Rahman, and Dennis Adhiswara. Nominations in the category of "Favorite" were chosen by members of the public via SMS, and in the category of "Best" by an appointed jury.

Nada Untuk Asa led the nominations with eight, with Cahaya Dari Timur: Beta Maluku followed with seven nominations and Di Balik 98 with six nominations. Cahaya Dari Timur: Beta Maluku was the biggest winner with receiving three golden film trophy awards. Other winners Di Balik 98 and Nada Untuk Asa won two trophy awards apiece.

For their work in Indonesian cinema, a Lifetime Achievement Award was presented to Mieke Wijaya and a Special Award to Alex Komang.

Winners and nominees

Best
Winners are listed first and highlighted in boldface.

Favorite
Winners are listed first and highlighted in boldface.

Film with most nominations and awards

Most nominations

The following film received most nominations:

Most wins
The following film received most nominations:

References

External links
 Situs web resmi IMA 2015

Indonesian
2015 in Indonesia
Indonesian Movie Actor Awards